Pakistan competed at the 2019 World Aquatics Championships in Gwangju, South Korea from 12 to 28 July.

Swimming

Pakistan entered three swimmers.

Men

Women

References

Nations at the 2019 World Aquatics Championships
Pakistan at the World Aquatics Championships
2019 in Pakistani sport